The Chief Secretary of Assam is the most senior civil servant in Assam. The secretary acts as the ex-officio Secretary to the Council of Ministers, therefore is also known as Secretary to the Cabinet. The Chief secretary is the Head of the Cabinet Secretariat Department. The functions include providing secretarial assistance to the cabinet, ensuring the implementation of decisions, acting as the policy coordination centre, serving as a data bank of information, organizing conferences. The Chief Secretary is an officer of Indian Administrative Service and is a member of the executive branch of the Government of Assam. The Chief Secretary ranks 23rd on the Indian order of precedence.

Paban Kumar Borthakur is the incumbent Chief Secretary of Assam since 1 September 2022. He replaced Jishnu Barua, the 49th Chief Secretary of Assam, who took retired on 31 August 2022.

Chief secretaries

References 

Indian Administrative Service officers
Government of Assam